The short-tailed gymnure (Hylomys suillus) is a small mammal from the family of the Erinaceidae. The scientific name of the species is first published by Salomon Müller in 1840.

Description 
The upperparts of the short-tailed gymnure are reddish brown to dark brown, with a grey tinge. The underparts are light grey, with white-tipped hairs. It resembles a large shrew, with a long snout and a very short hairless tail. It also has rounded, leathery ears.

Habits and habitat 
This mammal is active both day and night. The species lives in hill and montane forests up to 3,000m, but sometimes in humid lowland forests. It feeds mainly on insects on the ground but it also takes some fruit sometimes. They normally don't live any longer than 2 years.

Distribution 
The species lives mainly in Southeast Asia (Brunei, Cambodia, Indonesia, Laos, Malaysia, Myanmar, Thailand and Vietnam), but it is also found in China.

References

External links
Image at ADW

Hylomys
Mammals of Indonesia
Mammals of Thailand
Mammals of Malaysia
Mammals of China
Mammals of Myanmar
Mammals of Laos
Mammals of Vietnam
Mammals of Brunei
Mammals of Cambodia
Mammals of Borneo
Taxa named by Salomon Müller
Mammals described in 1840